Erigeron linearis is a species of flowering plant in the family Asteraceae known by the common name desert yellow fleabane or narrow leaved fleabane.

Description
Erigeron linearis is a small clumping perennial herb reaching a maximum height of 20 centimeters (8 inches), with a woody taproot. It has a center of many golden yellow disc florets and a fringe of as many as 38 pale to bright yellow or cream-colored ray florets.

Some Plateau Indian tribes used desert yellow fleabane as a poultice for treating sores.

Distribution and habitat
Erigeron linearis is native to the mountains of western North America from British Columbia as far south as Wyoming, northern Nevada and Mono County in California. The species grows in open rocky slopes dominated by sagebrush, bitterbrush or juniper.

Gallery

References

External links

United States Department of Agriculture Plants Profile
Calphotos Photo gallery, University of California

linearis
Flora of the Northwestern United States
Flora of Western Canada
Flora of California
Flora of the Great Basin
Plants described in 1834
Taxa named by William Jackson Hooker
Flora without expected TNC conservation status